Adam Jennings (born November 17, 1982) is a former American football wide receiver. He was drafted by the Atlanta Falcons in the sixth round of the 2006 NFL Draft. He played college football at Fresno State.

Jennings was also a member of the Detroit Lions and New York Giants.

College career
At Fresno State, Jennings was an All-WAC first-team selection as a kickoff returner during his senior year. He was also an academic All-WAC pick for four consecutive years.

Professional career

Atlanta Falcons
Jennings was drafted by the Atlanta Falcons in the sixth round of the 2006 NFL Draft. In two seasons with the Falcons, he totaled six receptions for 62 yards and one touchdown in 38 games while contributing with 53 punt returns.
He was cut by the Falcons on November 11, 2008.

Detroit Lions
After signing with the Detroit Lions in 2008, Jennings was cut at the end of the Lions' 2009 training camp on September 5. He was re-signed on September 30, but placed on season-ending injured reserve on October 5. He was later waived on December 29.

New York Giants
Jennings signed with the New York Giants on July 15, 2010. He was waived on August 6.

References

External links
 Detroit Lions bio

1982 births
Living people
Players of American football from Sacramento, California
American football wide receivers
American football return specialists
Fresno State Bulldogs football players
Atlanta Falcons players
Detroit Lions players
New York Giants players
People from Granite Bay, California